Gene Effect is an action video game developed by German studio Lightstorm 3D and released for iOS on May 2, 2012 and for Android on January 12, 2013.

Gameplay
Using the mining ship Triton, players navigate an alien planet in search of a lost ship.

Reception
Gene Effect received mixed to positive reviews from critics upon release. On Metacritic, the game holds a score of 78/100 based on 5 reviews.

References

Android (operating system) games
IOS games
Action video games
2012 video games
Video games developed in Germany